Cooties is a fictional communicable disease.

Cooties may also refer to:

 Cooties (film), a 2014 American horror comedy
 Cooties, a 2022 album by Bugs
 "Cooties", a song from the 2002 musical Hairspray

See also
 
 Cootie (disambiguation)